Yi Byeong-cheon (Hangeul: 이병천, also spelled Lee Byeong-chun, born January 5, 1965) is the veterinary professor at Seoul National University responsible for the ₩300 million KRW (about US$240,000) "Toppy" dog cloning program in 2007. Yi is a former aide to Hwang Woo-suk, a pioneer in the field with the "Snuppy" clone, who fell from grace after his stem cell research turned out to have been fabricated. Yi has been described as "one of the world's best-known dog cloning experts."

References

Living people
South Korean biologists
Dog breeding
Academic staff of Seoul National University
Seoul National University alumni
Year of birth missing (living people)